Thailand Advanced Institute of Science and Technology-Tokyo Institute of Technology (TAIST-Tokyo Tech) ,  is a virtual higher education institution in Thailand, established in 2007. It is a project supported by Thailand's National Science and Technology Development Agency (NSTDA) to act as a focal point for academic and research collaboration among NSTDA and partner universities both domestic and abroad. Students will enrolled in a host university, work with researchers in NSTDA, and get a degree from the host university.

Domestic partners, as of 2012, were King Mongkut's Institute of Technology Ladkrabang, Sirindhorn International Institute of Technology, Kasetsart University, King Mongkut's University of Technology Thonburi, and Mahidol University, with Tokyo Institute of Technology as a first foreign partner.

They offer master degree programs in Automotive Engineering; Information and Communication Technology with Embedded Systems; and Advanced and Sustainable Environment Engineering. Courses are taught mainly by professors from Tokyo Institute of Technology.

Partners
This is not a comprehensive list
 National Science and Technology Development Agency
 Tokyo Institute of Technology
 King Mongkut's University of Technology Thonburi
 King Mongkut's Institute of Technology Ladkrabang
 Kasetsart University
 Sirindhorn International Institute of Technology
 Thailand Science Park

See also 
 Thailand Graduate Institute of Science and Technology

References

External links 
 TAIST Tokyo Tech - official site

Institutes of higher education in Thailand
Engineering universities and colleges in Thailand
2007 establishments in Thailand
National Science and Technology Development Agency